No. 283 Squadron was a Royal Air Force squadron that served during the Second world war in the air-sea rescue (ASR) mission role while flying Supermarine Walruses and both in ASR and the anti-submarine patrol role while flying Vickers Warwicks.

History
No. 283 Squadron was formed at Algiers on 11 February 1943 as an air-sea rescue squadron. The squadron was equipped with the Supermarine Walrus and was responsible for air-sea rescue along the North African coast. The squadron moved to Palermo in August 1943 to provide cover for the campaign in southern Italy. The squadron re-equipped with the Vickers Warwick in February 1944 and moved to RAF Hal Far, Malta. At the end of the Second World War the squadron disbanded at RAF Hal Far on 31 March 1946.

Aircraft operated

Squadron bases

See also
List of Royal Air Force aircraft squadrons

References

Notes

Bibliography

 Franks, Norman. Beyond Courage: Air Sea Rescue by Walrus Squadrons in the Adriatic, Mediterranean and Tyrrhenian Seas, 1942-1945. London: Grub Street, 2003. .
 Halley, James J. The Squadrons of the Royal Air Force & Commonwealth, 1918-1988. Tonbridge, Kent, UK: Air-Britain (Historians) Ltd., 1988. .
 Jefford, C.G. RAF Squadrons, a Comprehensive Record of the Movement and Equipment of all RAF Squadrons and their Antecedents since 1912. Shrewsbury, Shropshire, UK: Airlife Publishing, 2001. .
 Rawlings, John D.R. Coastal, Support and Special Squadrons of the RAF and their Aircraft. London, Jane's Publishing Company Ltd., 1982. .

External links

 Malta Memories with No. 283 Squadron
 No 281 - 285 Squadron Histories
 Squadron bases

Military units and formations established in 1943
Aircraft squadrons of the Royal Air Force in World War II
283 Squadron
Rescue aviation units and formations
Military units and formations disestablished in 1946